Liza Li (born Liza Wilke on March 30, 1988 in Düsseldorf) is a German singer. Her songtexts deal with the themes of love and violence as experienced by young women.

Life
According to the biography of her record label Warner she moved out at the age of 14 years and lived at a friend's house and got her first musical experiences in a band.

Her first single "Ich könnte dich erschießen (I could shoot you)", as well as the songs on her album 18 released in autumn 2006, was written by Thorsten Börger who already wrote songs for Tic Tac Toe and Falco.

On November 19, 2007, she said she would work for the channel VIVA as a host. She's doing the shows Straßencharts and VIVY Top 100.

Liza appeared on the front cover of April 2008's issue of German Playboy.

Discography

Singles
 "Ich könnte dich erschießen" (2006; Warner)
 "Sterben" (2006; Warner)
 "Zum Glück macht Liebe blind" (2007)

Albums

Track listing
 "Liza Li"
 "Ich könnte dich erschießen"
 "Zum Glück mach Liebe blind"
 "Sterben"
 "Hörst du mich"
 "Sex"
 "Ihr armen Reichen"
 "Ich will"
 "Montag"
 "Im Namen Gottes"
 "Komm zurück" ( English Lyrics )
 "Doktor Doktor"

References

External links
 
 Official site on myspace.com
 TVmatrix

1988 births
Living people
Musicians from Düsseldorf
German pop musicians
21st-century German women singers
Mass media people from Düsseldorf
German female adult models